Waterhen Lake First Nation ( sihkihp sâkahikanihk)  is a Cree First Nation band government located in northwestern Saskatchewan, Canada. As of October 2018 the total membership of the Waterhen Lake First Nation was 2,053. There were 983 members living on reserve, 2 on Crown Land and 1,068 members living off reserve. The First Nation is a member of the MLTC Program Services, a regional tribal Chiefs' Council.  The First Nation is also a signatory to the Adhesion to Treaty 6 in 1921.

Government
The current elected leadership of the community consists of Chief Blaine Fiddler (1st Term - Former Councillor) and six Councillors:
Dustin Ross Fiddler (3rd Term), Carol Bernard (Former Chief - 1st Term Council), Ableheza Ernest (5th Term), Karnella Fiddler (3rd Term), David Fleury (3rd Term), and Peter Bouvier (1st Term). Their current elected term expires on December 23, 2022. Waterhen Lake First Nation is currently under Indian Act Election codes and thus has a new election every 2 years - rather than 3 or 4 as most democratic institutions operate.

Assisting the elected officials in their duties are the current Band Manager Calvin Opikokew, and Executive Assistant Jillian Roundsky.

Reserves
Waterhen 130 is a reserve in Saskatchewan, Canada, located 39 km north of the community of Meadow Lake, Saskatchewan, Canada.  It is 7,972.0 ha. in size.  It is the sole reserve and community of the Waterhen Lake First Nation.

Within the reserve community there is a store, an arena, a water treatment facility, a school, a clinic, and Band and postal offices.  The community is home to a newly built health center, a nursery to grade twelve school called Waweyekisik [Wow-ee-yeek-isik], confectionery and numerous other community facilities.

The community's economy relies heavily on the forestry industry in the region, as well as the tourism and farming industries. Waterhen Lake First Nation members have many established business operations including the band-owned M & N Resort on the shores of Waterhen Lake, eco-tourism guiding businesses.

With a population of approximately 1896 members, the Waterhen Lake First Nation serves its band members in the form of capital projects, health and social programming and cultural activities.

References

First Nations governments in Saskatchewan
Cree governments